The 1996–97 League of Ireland Premier Division was the 12th season of the League of Ireland Premier Division. The division was made up of 12 teams. Derry City F.C. won the title.

Regular season
The season saw each team playing three rounds of games, playing every other team three times, totalling 33 games.

Final Table

Results

Matches 1–22

Matches 23–33

Promotion/relegation play-off
Dundalk F.C. who finished in tenth place played off against Waterford United, the third placed team from the 1996–97 League of Ireland First Division.

1st Leg

2nd Leg

Dundalk F.C. won 3–1 on aggregate and retained their place in the Premier Division.

See also
 1996–97 League of Ireland First Division

References

Ireland
1996–97 in Republic of Ireland association football
League of Ireland Premier Division seasons